Atlanta's mild climate and plentiful trees allow for festivals and events to take place in the city year-round. One of the city's most popular events is the Atlanta Dogwood Festival, an arts and crafts festival held in Piedmont Park each spring, when the native dogwoods are in bloom. Atlanta Streets Alive, inspired by the ciclovía in Bogotá, Colombia, closes city streets to car traffic to allow people to participate in health and community-oriented, such as bicycling, strolling, skating, people-watching, tango, yoga, hula hooping, and break dancing.

Neighborhood
Inman Park Festival, held in the spring in one of Atlanta’s oldest neighborhoods, offers an artist market, live entertainment, and a wide variety of food vendors. Kirkwood Spring Fling is held in eastside neighborhood of Kirkwood each May. The festival is centered on Bessie Branham Park and features a 5K run in the morning, artist market, live music, Tour of Homes, and a variety of local food trucks and restaurants. Little Five Points Halloween Festival, winner of the 2003 Best Festival award by the International Festival and Events Association, takes place the weekend before Halloween in Atlanta's bohemian district, involving a parade and costume contest. The Virginia Highland neighborhood holds both an annual Virginia-Highland Summerfest festival, focusing on art but also featuring the dave fm music stage; as well as the Virginia-Highland Tour of Homes each December and the North Highland Mile around Easter.

Ethnic
Atlanta's large Hispanic community is represented in Festival Peachtree Latino, the largest multicultural festival in the Southeast, which is held annually at Piedmont Park. Other ethnic celebrations include the National Black Arts Festival, the Atlanta Caribbean Carnival, St. Patrick's Day parade, the Atlanta Greek Festival, the Atlanta Turkish Festival, Festival of India, JapanFest, and Korean Festival.

LGBT+
Atlanta is home to some of the nation's largest gay pride festivals, Atlanta Pride, as well as what is billed as the world's largest black gay pride celebration, Atlanta Black Pride.

Film
Atlanta is the host of the Atlanta Film Festival, an Academy Award qualifying, international film festival held every April and showcasing a diverse range of independent films, including genre films such as horror and sci-fi. Other film festivals include the Atlanta Jewish Film Festival, the Atlanta Asian Film Festival, the Out on Film gay film festival, Independent Film Month, Atlanta Film Festival 365, Atlanta Underground Film Festival, Atlanta International Documentary Film Festival, and the Buried Alive horror film fest.
There is also the Bronzelens Film Festival, held every year in Atlanta.

Music
Atlanta's main music festival is Music Midtown, which was revived in 2011 after a six-year hiatus. The festival, which is held in Piedmont Park, hosts major bands like Coldplay and The Black Keys. Peachtree Music Festival is a one-day, two-stage outdoor music festival held at the corner of 8th Street and Spring Street in the city's Midtown district. The festival blends indie rock bands with electronica DJs. Atlanta also hosts one of the largest free jazz festivals in the country, the Atlanta Jazz Festival.  In 2017, the Atlanta Jazz Festival will celebrate its 40th year and include 40 Days of Jazz leading up to the Memorial Day weekend event that takes place in Piedmont Park. Corndogorama is a yearly music festival, founded in 1996 by Dave Railey, which features performances from local bands including Indie rock, Hip hop, Metal, and Electronic groups. There is also an Atlanta Trumpet Festival.

Conventions
Dragon Con is a yearly multigenre convention with an associated parade. Dragon Con's 2014 attendance was 63,000.

Races
Atlanta hosts dozens of yearly races including the Peachtree Road Race.

List of some festivals and events

A3C Festival & Conference
Anime Weekend Atlanta
Atlanta Arts Festival in Piedmont Park
Atlanta Asian Cultural Experience
Atlanta Black Pride
Atlanta Caribbean Carnival
Atlanta Celebrates Photography
Atlanta Cycling Festival
Atlanta Dogwood Festival
Atlanta Film Festival
Atlanta Greek Festival
Atlanta Ice Cream Festival
Atlanta Jazz Festival
Atlanta Jewish Film Festival
Atlanta Pride
Atlanta Streets Alive
Bulgarian Festival Atlanta
Atlanta Turkish Festival
Cheese Fest Atlanta
Children's Christmas Parade
Dragon Con

Fall in the Fourth, Old Fourth Ward
Festival of India
Festival of Trees
Festival on Ponce, Druid Hills
Festival Peachtree Latino
First Night
 Fourth of July at Lenox Square and Centennial Olympic Park
Furry Weekend Atlanta
Gathering 4 Gardner
Georgia Renaissance Festival
Honda Battle of the Bands
Inman Park Festival
JapanFest Atlanta
JordanCon
Juneteenth Parade & Music Festival
Kirkwood Spring Fling
Kirkwood Wine Stroll
Kirkwood Home for the Holidays
Korean Festival
Little Five Points Halloween Festival
MomoCon
Music Midtown

National Black Arts Festival
Outlanta Con 
Out on Film
Passion Play
Peachtree Road Race
Screen on the Green
Seishun-Con
Southeastern Flower Show
St. Patrick's Day Parade
Sweet Auburn Heritage Festival
Sweet Auburn Music Fest
Sweetwater 420 Festival, Candler Park
Summit Racing Equipment Atlanta Motorama at Atlanta Motor Speedway
Taste of Atlanta
Taste of Buckhead
TimeGate
TomorrowWorld
Tour de Georgia
Virginia-Highland Summerfest
Virginia-Highland Tour of Homes
Walker Stalker Convention
Yellow Daisy Festival

References